Ibrahima Kader Ariel Bamba (born 22 April 2002) is an Italian professional footballer who plays as a defensive midfielder for Primeira Liga club Vitória Guimarães.

Club career
Born in Italy to Ivorian parents, Bamba began playing football with the youth academy of Pro Vercelli at the age of 15 in 2015.

He moved to Portugal with Vitória de Guimarães in 2020. On 26 January 2022, Bamba signed a professional contract with Vitória, keeping him at the club until 2025 with a €30m release clause. He made his professional debut with Vitória in a 3–0 Primeira Liga loss to Benfica on 27 February 2022.

International career
On 24 May 2022, Italy national football team manager Roberto Mancini called Bamba to join a 53-player training camp for the Azzurri.

References

External links
 

2002 births
Living people
People from Vercelli
Italian footballers
Italian people of Ivorian descent
Italian sportspeople of African descent
Sportspeople of Ivorian descent
Naturalised citizens of Italy
Association football midfielders
F.C. Pro Vercelli 1892 players
Vitória S.C. players
Vitória S.C. B players
Primeira Liga players
Campeonato de Portugal (league) players
Italian expatriate footballers
Italian expatriate sportspeople in Portugal
Expatriate footballers in Portugal